Magnano is a comune (municipality) in the Province of Biella in the Italian region Piedmont, located about  northeast of Turin and about  south of Biella.

Magnano borders the following municipalities: Bollengo, Cerrione, Palazzo Canavese, Piverone, Torrazzo, Zimone, Zubiena.

Culture
Musica Antica a Magnano is a non-profit association founded in 1986 to promote a festival offering an opportunity to hear historically informed performances of early music on original instruments. The Festival concerts are held in August and early September in either a 12th-century church San Secondo or in the town's 18th-century church. The latter also houses an organ built in 1794 by Giovanni Bruna and restored by Italo Marzi.

See also 

 Bose Monastic Community, an ecumenical community founded by Enzo Bianchi in 1965 at Bose, a frazione in the commune of Magnano
 Lancia d'Oro, a men's professional golf tournament held in Italy from 1962 to 1976 in Magnano

References

External links

 Site of the association Musica Antica a Magnano